Metropolitan Area Express (usually abbreviated MAX) may refer to:

 MAX Light Rail, a light rail system in Portland, Oregon
 Metropolitan Area Express (Las Vegas), a bus rapid transit line in Las Vegas, Nevada
 Metro Area Express, a bus rapid transit line in Kansas City, Missouri
 Metro Area Express (Perth), a cancelled light rail system in Perth, Western Australia